The Olympus OM-D E-M5 Mark III is the third iteration of the enthusiast-level mirrorless interchangeable-lens camera produced by Olympus on the Micro Four-Thirds system. The camera is the successor to the Olympus OM-D E-M5 Mark II and was released on November 15, 2019.

The E-M5 Mark III boasts the multi-shot high resolution mode introduced in the E-M5 Mark II, allowing the 20MP sensor to produce 50MP images while on tripod. As with most Olympus Micro Four-Thirds cameras, the E-M5 Mark III includes 5-axis image stabilization in the camera body, allowing lenses without image stabilization to be fitted to the camera. The E-M5 Mark III is capable of 4K video at 30 and 24 frames per second.

Features 

 20 Megapixel Micro Four-Thirds sensor
 121 point autofocus
 50 Megapixel high resolution multi-shot mode
 2.36 million dot OLED electronic viewfinder
 Weather-sealed body
 Articulated touchscreen

Reception 
The E-M5 Mark III received positive reviews upon release, lauding its small size comparative to equivalent DSLR cameras and the professional-level E-M1 that includes many of the same features as the E-M5 Mark III. Reviewers criticized the E-M5 Mark III for its short battery life and lightweight feel due to its plastic exterior, a change from previous iterations of the OM-D series. However, the plastic casing allowed the camera to achieve the lightest weight and smallest size of any Olympus 20MP camera of its time.

References 

OM-D E-M5 Mark III
Cameras introduced in 2019